CARDIAC (CARDboard Illustrative Aid to Computation) is a learning aid developed by David Hagelbarger and Saul Fingerman for  Bell Telephone Laboratories in 1968 to teach high school students how computers work. The kit consists of an instruction manual and a die-cut cardboard "computer".

The computer "operates" by means of pencil and sliding cards. Any arithmetic is done in the head of the person operating the computer. The computer operates in base 10 and has 100 memory cells which can hold signed numbers from 0 to ±999. It has an instruction set of 10 instructions which allows CARDIAC to add, subtract, test, shift, input, output and jump.

Hardware

The “CPU” of the computer consists of 4 slides that move various numbers and arrows to have the flow of the real CPU (the user's brain) move the right way. They have one flag (+/-), affected by the result in the accumulator.

Memory consists of the other half of the cardboard cutout. There are 100 cells.  Cell 0 is “ROM”, always containing a numeric "1"; cells 1 to 98 are “RAM”; available for instructions and data; and cell 99 can best be described as “EEPROM”.

Memory cells hold signed decimal numbers from 0 to ±999 and are written with a pencil. Cells are erased with an eraser. A “bug” is provided to act as a program counter, and is placed in a hole beside the current memory cell.

Programming

CARDIAC has a 10 instruction machine language. An instruction is three decimal digits (the sign is ignored) in the form OAA. The first digit is the op code (O); the second and third digits are an address (AA). Addressing is one of accumulator to memory absolute, absolute memory to accumulator, input to absolute memory and absolute memory to output.

High level languages have never been developed for CARDIAC as they would defeat one of the purposes of the device: to introduce concepts of assembly language programming.

Programs are hand assembled and then are penciled into the appropriate memory cells.

Instruction Set

Operation

Programs are run by first sliding three slides so that the number in the instruction register equals the number in the memory cell the bug is sitting in. Once that is done the bug is moved to the next memory cell. The user then follows an arrow which will then tell them what to do next. This continues for all of program execution.

See also
 Little man computer (another instructional model)
 WDR paper computer

External links
 a discussion of the CARDIAC with examples and a simulator in JavaScript
 an interpreter and interactive debugger on the .NET platform on GitHub
 cinc/jcinc – a simulator for the Java platform with both command-line and GUI interfaces on SourceForge
 Software Emulator for the CARDIAC – hosted on Macintosh, Windows (untested), and Linux (untested); provides editor, simple assembler, and examples; opcodes 0 and 9 are interchanged as described on the page; source code appears to be proprietary; free downloads
 Quick Tour of the Built CARDIAC computer on YouTube
 CPU Design on Paper – Al Williams' spreadsheet version of CARDIAC on the Dr. Dobb's site
 Paper to FPGA – Al Williams' FPGA implementation of CARDIAC on an FPGA board (final article of a series on Dr. Dobb's web site)

Models of computation